Mother-in-law is a kinship relationship as a result of marriage.

Mother-in-law may also refer to:

"Mother-in-Law" (song)
Mother-in-law (sandwich)
Mother-in-Law Island, in Connecticut, U.S.

See also
Mother-in-law apartment
Mother-in-law language
Mother-in-Law Lounge